Jirásek Bridge is a bridge over the Vltava in Prague, Czech Republic.

External links
 

Bridges in Prague
Bridges over the Vltava